Mäetaguse is a small borough in Ida-Viru County in Alutaguse Parish in northeastern Estonia. It was the administrative centre of Mäetaguse Parish. As of 2011 Census, the settlement's population was 555, of which the Estonians were 271 (48.8%).

Mäetaguse Manor
Mäetaguse estate was mentioned for the first time in written sources in 1542. Until the Estonian Declaration of Independence, it belonged to different Baltic German families, among others the Wrangel and von Rosen. Between 1923 and 1988 it served as a schoolhouse. Today it houses a hotel and spa.

Gallery

References

External links

Mäetaguse hotel and spa (official site)

Boroughs and small boroughs in Estonia
Kreis Wierland